Grossicis is a genus of tree-fungus beetle in the family Ciidae.

Species
 Grossicis diadematus (Mellié, 1849)
 Grossicis laminicornis Antunes-Carvalho, Sandoval-Gómez & Lopes-Andrade, 2012

References

Ciidae genera